Heinz Hubert Baumann (11 December 1946 – 24 April 2010) was a German Roman-Catholic priest in Aachen.

Life 
Heinz Baumann grew up as the first son of August and Agnes Baumann in Jülich- and attended the humanities-oriented gymnasium . There he came into contact with the teachings of Francis de Sales and early on developed the desire to become a priest. After graduating in 1966, he studied philosophy and theology in Bonn and Tübingen under Hans Küng and Joseph Ratzinger and was ordained as a priest on 17 June 1972 in Krefeld. On 29 December 1981 (with effect from 1 January 1982) bishop Klaus Hemmerle appointed him to become the successor of Ferdinand Lenßen as pastor of St. Elisabeth. He was introduced into his duties on 17 January 1982. At the end of 1998, Heinz Baumann fell seriously ill for about seven months. After his recovery and return he continued to lead the parish until 2009. He died from illness on 24 April 2010. His grave is located in his birthplace Barmen.

Work 
Baumann wanted to see church as a meeting place widely open for anyone and beyond confessional borders. He typically tried to convince people with deeds rather than words and to thereby encourage imitation. He was motivated by a deep belief and commitment to social justice, reflected in a multitude of projects, events and long-term established facilities. Besides his child and youth work he helped long-term unemployed people (f.e. by the creation of an unemployment center), drug addicts, and he supported the peace movement, cross-cultural communication and intercultural exchange. He also encouraged people to take over responsibility and initiative themselves.

While to him working with the youth had the highest priority he also continued to maintain already established initiatives such as the "Elisabeth Conference", a program originally founded in 1908 to support poor people, and among them especially elderly women and, increasingly, single mothers. Between 1989 and 2004 he set up a clothing store for people in need. In 1991, he helped set up a library open to everyone. He also initiated a local newspaper.

Between 1991 and 1994, a nationwide exchange program took place under the name "" between German St. Elisabeth parishes. More than one hundred pupils from cities such as Bottrop, Eisenach, Aachen and Königs-Wusterhausen participated in this program.

Gifted with a certain kind of wit, Baumann became known to also take unconventional and sometimes odd measures to support people in need. He actively participated in many social-political discussions and was not shy to exchange even vehement arguments with superiors inside and outside the church.

Open also to worldly amusements, Baumann was guided by his insight: "Jesus must have been a happy person, why else would he have turned water into wine?"
For example, he was a member of the traditional '' in Barmen and honoured member of the carneval society ''.

From 1990 on he repeatedly celebrated holy masses in the circus tent of the Circus Roncalli whenever they came around to visit Aachen on their journey.

Since 1994 on the occasion of the annual World Animal Day he carried out animal blessings of domestic animals in memory of Francis of Assisi.
 
Being a passionate football fan since his youth, Baumann officially looked after the team of the 1. FC Köln pastorally, an initiative originally started in 1991 when he supported the players in the struggles after the accidental death of the German Bundesliga player Maurice Banach. Over time he thereby became known as "FC pastor" nationally.

As a diocesan minister, he led seminars and workshops on intergenerationality in the Maria Laach Abbey. In addition, he was deputy federal praeses of the federal association of Catholic male communities and men's facility in Germany.

In 1993, Baumann was awarded the  prize of the Zeitungsverlag Aachen for demonstrating virtues such as helpfulness, humor, repartee, originality and passion for Aachen.

Heinz Baumann inspired the German artist  to create several portraits, some of which could be seen posthumously f.e. in the 2012 exhibition "Fanum Profanum".

From 2002, he fought to continue the social services for young people and to keep the unemployment center open against austerity and closure intentions imposed by his superiors. He also advocated for employees threatened with redundancies, including offering parts of his own salary. At the same time Baumann tried to save costs and increase the attractiveness of the church by moving parts of the parish office into the church itself in 2002 (project "", engl. "Desk in the church") so that the church could open to visitors also in the mornings. In 2003, further ideas for new usage concepts were presented. In 2005, this led to redesigning the entrance area of the church, which now could be easily inspected from outside through a newly created window in order to remove threshold fears to enter the church from pedestrians in the streets. The parish office was relocated into there and combined with a café meeting point open to anyone.

In parallel, in 2004/2005, Baumann personally supported the initiative of several pupils of the parish to repaint the entire interior of the church (project "", engl. These flourishing contacts resulted in that he was asked to inaugurate their local  (engl. 'Brother Klaus Chapel') in July 2008.

See also

 Heinrich Mussinghoff
 Giovanni Melchiorre Bosco
 Salesians of Don Bosco (SDB)
 Pastor Lenssen Polytechnic College (PLPC)
 Ignaci Siluvai
 
 
  (AGV)

References

Further reading 
 
  (116+2 pages)
  (72+4 pages) (Excerpts: Archive.org PDF)

20th-century German Roman Catholic priests
People from Aachen
1946 births
2010 deaths
1. FC Köln non-playing staff